Strega, the Italian word for witch, may refer to:

Strega, a group of pagan magic users who are part of the protectors of Venice in the Heirs of Alexandria series by Mercedes Lackey, Eric Flint, and Dave Freer
Stregheria, or the Strega tradition of modern Italian witchcraft

Other
Characters of Persona 3#Strega, a fictional group of Persona Users in the game Persona 3
Strega (liqueur)
Strega (novel), by Andrew Vachss
Strega Prize, an Italian literary award
Strega (aircraft), a P-51 Mustang that races at the Reno Air Races